Vormsi Landscape Conservation Area is a nature reserve situated on Vormsi Island, Lääne County, Estonia.

Its area is 2423 ha.

The protected area was designated in 2007 to protect the nature of Vormsi Island.

References

Nature reserves in Estonia
Geography of Lääne County